Cristian Campagna (born November 29, 2001) is a Canadian soccer player who plays for the HFX Wanderers of the Canadian Premier League.

Early life
Born in Vancouver, he moved to nearby Surrey at age 2, where he began playing soccer at age four with Surrey United SC. In August 2015, he joined the Vancouver Whitecaps FC Academy and began playing for the Vancouver Whitecaps U23 in 2021.

College career
In June 2020, he committed to the University at Albany, SUNY to play for the men's soccer team. He made his debut on February 19, 2021 against the Syracuse Orange. After starting all nine games, he was named an America East All-Rookie selection. He was also named to the FTF Canada All-Freshman First Team. He departed Albany after one season.

Club career 
In March 2022, he signed a professional contract with Whitecaps FC 2 in MLS Next Pro. He made his professional debut on March 26 against Houston Dynamo 2. He served as team captain during his time with WFC2.

In August 2022, Campagna signed a contract through the 2023 season, with an option for 2024, with Canadian Premier League club HFX wanderers. He made his debut on August 28 against FC Edmonton. In November 2022, Campagna joined 2. Bundesliga side 1. FC Nürnberg on an off-season training stint. In December 2022, he went on trial with German 3. Liga club FSV Zwickau.

International career
He played for Western Canada at the Danone Nations Cup national final in 2013. In February 2016, he was called up to a national youth team camp for the first time with the Canada U15.

In 2021 and 2022, he was a regular training squad member (despite not being an official call-up) with the Canadian national team during their 2022 FIFA World Cup qualification schedule.

Personal
He is the older brother of fellow professional soccer player Matteo Campagna.

References

External links

Living people
2001 births
Association football defenders
Canadian soccer players
Whitecaps FC 2 players
MLS Next Pro players
HFX Wanderers FC players